Ernst Fredrik Eckhoff (28 April 1905 – 14 September 1997) was a Norwegian judge.

He was born in 1905 as a son of jurist Nicolay Kristian Schreuder Eckhoff (1870–1955). He was a second cousin of legal academic Torstein Eckhoff, designer Tias Eckhoff and actor Johannes Eckhoff, and a grandnephew of architect Niels Stockfleth Darre Eckhoff. He was also a first cousin of Anders Lange. He lived in Kristiansand.

During the occupation of Norway by Nazi Germany, he was a member of Milorg. He was discovered and arrested by the Nazi authorities in December 1942, and was incarcerated at Grini from 28 June 1943 to the liberation of Norway on 8 May 1945. Soon after the liberation he was named as a Supreme Court Justice. In 1945 he was also named as a member of the commission Undersøkelseskommisjonen av 1945 that scrutinized the actions of the Norwegian government in 1940. The other commission members were Gustav Adolf Lammers Heiberg, Arnold Holmboe, Ole Hallesby, Nils Nilsen Thune, Arne Bergsgård and Sverre Steen, and the secretary was Helge Sivertsen. The background for the commission was the German invasion of Norway on 9 April 1940, and the question was raised whether Norway could have avoided it through a different foreign and security policy. Second, the actions of Norwegian authorities between 9 April and 25 September 1940 were investigated, both regarding the three branches of government (Parliament, Government, Supreme Court) that eventually laid down their offices, but also the transition authority (the Administrative Council) as well as other relevant civil and military bodies.

In 1952 he was rumored to replace Oscar Christian Gundersen as Minister of Justice and the Police, but this did not happen. He continued as a Supreme Court Justice until retiring in 1975. In the 1980s he was a member of the board of Scandinavian Airlines System. He died on 14 September 1997.

References

1905 births
1997 deaths
Supreme Court of Norway justices
Norwegian resistance members
People from Kristiansand
Grini concentration camp survivors